Mount Manning Nature Reserve is a nature reserve in the Goldfields region of Western Australia north of Southern Cross in the area known as the Northern Yilgarn.

The Mount Manning Range is located inside the reserve.

On 14 May 2007 EPA Bulletin 1256 proposed an A Class Nature Reserve to be established.

It was announced in September 2010.

The reserve is one of a number of reserves being incorporated into the Northern Yilgarn Conservation Reserves Management Plan.
The other reserves are Mount Elvire Conservation Park, Die Hardy Range Nature Reserve, Diemals/Mount Jackson/Windaring, and Juardi Conservation Park.

References

Coolgardie woodlands
Goldfields-Esperance
Nature reserves in Western Australia